Alex Graves is a computer scientist. Before working as a research scientist at DeepMind, he earned a BSc in Theoretical Physics from the University of Edinburgh and a PhD in artificial intelligence under Jürgen Schmidhuber at IDSIA. He was also a postdoc under Schmidhuber at the Technical University of Munich and under Geoffrey Hinton at the University of Toronto.

At IDSIA, Graves trained long short-term memory neural networks by a novel method called connectionist temporal classification (CTC). This method outperformed traditional speech recognition models in certain applications. In 2009, his CTC-trained LSTM was the first recurrent neural network to win pattern recognition contests, winning several competitions in connected handwriting recognition.
This method has become very popular. Google uses CTC-trained LSTM for speech recognition on the smartphone.

Graves is also the creator of neural Turing machines and the closely related differentiable neural computer.

References

Living people
Artificial intelligence researchers
Computer scientists
Alumni of the University of Edinburgh
Year of birth missing (living people)
Place of birth missing (living people)